YYH may refer to:

 YuYu Hakusho, a Japanese manga series written and illustrated by Yoshihiro Togashi
 YYH, the IATA code for Taloyoak Airport, Nunavut, Canada